Pettisville is an unincorporated community and census-designated place (CDP) in Clinton and German townships, Fulton County, Ohio, United States. As of the 2010 census the population was 498.

History
Pettisville was laid out in 1857, and most likely was named for one Mr. Pettis, a railroad contractor. A post office was established at Pettisville in 1857.

Geography
Pettisville is in southwestern Fulton County, with the eastern portion of the community in Clinton Township and the western portion in German Township.

Demographics

Notable citizens
Myrl Sauder, Vice President of Engineering and "Chief Tinkerer" at the Innovation Group at Sauder with 16 patents. Sauder led key efforts to invent new products and new machines that would help Sauder become a world class furniture manufacturer.

Girl Named Tom — a sibling band, composed of Caleb, Joshua and Bekah Grace Liechty. Winners of season 21 of NBC’s The Voice which kicked off September 20, 2021 and finished December 14, 2021. The trio made history as the first group to win The Voice.

Mark Matthews, internationally recognized for his mastery of the glass sphere. Matthews work is held in museums such as the Victoria and Albert Museum, the Corning Museum of Glass, the Toledo Museum of Art, and the National Museum of American Art.

References

External links
Pettisville Friendship Days
Pettisville Local School District
Pettisville Community Park

Census-designated places in Fulton County, Ohio
1857 establishments in Ohio
Populated places established in 1857